Albert Hunt may refer to: 

Albert Hunt (inventor), American inventor
Albert C. Hunt (1888–1956), American jurist
Al Hunt (born 1942), American journalist
Prince Albert Hunt, American country blues fiddle player

See also
Alfred Hunt (disambiguation)